Iota Coronae Borealis, Latinized from ι Coronae Borealis, is a binary star system in the constellation Corona Borealis. It is visible to the naked eye with a combined apparent visual magnitude of is 4.96. Based upon an annual parallax shift of 10.46 mas as seen from the Earth, it is located about 312 light years from the Sun.

This is a single-lined spectroscopic binary with an orbital period of 35.5 days and an eccentricity of 0.56. The secondary member, component B, appears to be an A-type star.

References

A-type giants
Mercury-manganese stars
Spectroscopic binaries
Corona Borealis
Coronae Borealis, Iota
Durchmusterung objects
Coronae Borealis, 14
143807
078493
5971